Ricky Bryant (born March 24, 1981) is a former American football wide receiver of the National Football League (NFL). He played college football at Ohio State University and Hofstra University.

Professional career

New England Patriots
On May 2, 2004, Bryant signed with the New England Patriots as an undrafted free agent. He was released on September 5, 2004. On December 8, 2004, he signed with the New England Patriots to join their practice squad. On February 16, 2005, he re-signed with the New England Patriots and was allocated to the Hamburg Sea Devils of the NFL Europe for the 2005 season.

San Diego Chargers
On May 31, 2006, he signed with the San Diego Chargers. On September 2, 2006, he was released. On November 15, 2006, he was signed to the team's practice squad. 

Bryant's Super Bowl XXXIX ring was sold on the television show "Pawn Stars" for US$21,000.

References

 

1981 births
Living people
American football wide receivers
Hofstra Pride football players
New England Patriots players
San Diego Chargers players